Mexico–Russia relations are the diplomatic relations between the United Mexican States and the Russian Federation. Both nations are members of the Asia-Pacific Economic Cooperation, G-20 major economies and the United Nations.
Today the two countries share extensive partnerships in areas such as space, trade and military technologies as well as telecommunications.

History 

In 1806 the Russian Empire under Emperor Alexander I, began an ambitious plan to expand its activities in Alaska (settled from the 1780s) and in California (then under control of the Spanish Empire). In 1806 the Russian diplomat and explorer Nikolai Rezanov arrived in California in order to secure food production for Russian fur-trade colonies. In 1812 the Russian-American Company established Fort Ross in present-day northern California.

Mexico and Russia formally established diplomatic relations on 1 December 1890 in Mexico City, with Baron Roman Rosen representing Emperor Alexander III of Russia. In 1891 the first Russian legation opened in the Mexican capital. During respective revolutions; 1910–1920 in Mexico and 1917 in Russia; diplomatic relations between the two countries were practically non-existent.

Soviet Union
In 1922, Russia became part of the Soviet Union. In August 1924, Mexico became the first country in the Americas to establish relations with the Soviet Union. In 1926, the Soviets appointed Alexandra Kollontai, the first female ambassador in the world, as their ambassador to Mexico.

On 26 January 1930, the two nations severed diplomatic relations because of "ideological differences". In 1936 the former Soviet politician Leon Trotsky and his wife, Natalia Sedova, moved to Mexico from Norway during their exile. Mexican President Lázaro Cárdenas welcomed Trotsky warmly and even arranged for a special train to bring him to Mexico City from the port of Tampico. In Mexico, Trotsky once lived at the home of painters Diego Rivera and Frida Kahlo. In August 1940, an NKVD agent, Ramón Mercader, assassinated Trotsky in his study.

In May 1942, Mexico entered World War II by declaring war on the Axis Powers and so became an ally of the Soviet Union. Diplomatic relations between the nations resumed in November 1942. In 1973, Mexican President Luis Echeverría became the first Mexican and the first non-communist Latin American head of state to visit the Soviet Union. In 1978, during an official visit by Mexican President José López Portillo to the Soviet Union, Mexico, on the behalf of Latin America and the Soviet Union, signed the Treaty of Tlatelolco which prohibits "testing, use, manufacture, production or acquisition by any means whatsoever of any nuclear weapons" in Latin America and the Caribbean.

Yuri Knorozov, a Soviet linguist, epigrapher and ethnographer, played an extremely important role in the decipherment of the Maya script, the writing system used by the pre-Columbian Maya civilization of Mesoamerica. Yuri was awarded the Orden del Águila Azteca (Order of the Aztec Eagle) in 1994, the highest decoration awarded by Mexico to non-citizens, which was presented to him at a ceremony at the Mexican Embassy in Moscow.

Russian Federation
After the end of the Soviet Union in December 1991, Mexico continued to maintain diplomatic relations with the new Russian Federation as its successor state. Since then, bilateral relations between the two nations have steadily increased. Mexico has purchased various military equipment from Russia. The Mexican Navy has received BTR-60s Ural-4320, Mi-17/8s and 9K38 Igla anti-aircraft missiles. In 2001 and 2013, Russia launched Mexican communication satellites into space from the town of Baikonur, Kazakhstan, which is administered by Russia for space launch programs. In 2009, a joint Mexican-Russian Tatiana-2 mission was launched into space. Another joint satellite (Mijailo Lomonósov) between both nations will launch in the near future. In 2015, both nations celebrated 125 years of diplomatic relations.

In February 2020, Russian Foreign Minister Sergey Lavrov paid a visit to Mexico and met with his counterpart Marcelo Ebrard. Both foreign ministers discussed current relations between both nations and the celebration of 130 years of diplomatic relations between both nations. In April 2021, Foreign Minister Marcelo Ebrard paid a visit to Russia with the objective of promoting bilateral cooperation and establishing priority lines of action in the short and long term and to discuss joint cooperation against COVID-19.

During the 2022 Russian invasion of Ukraine, Mexico condemned Russia's action and requested the respect for Ukraine's territorial integrity. Mexico also condemned Russia's action at the United Nations Security Council as a non-Permanent Member.

On 1 March, President Andrés Manuel López Obrador announced that Mexico would not be participating in any economic sanctions against Russia and criticised the overseas censorship of Russian state media.

High-level visits

High-level visits from Mexico to the USSR / Russia
 President Luis Echeverría (1973)
 President José López Portillo (1978)
 President Carlos Salinas de Gortari (1991)
 President Vicente Fox (2005)
 President Felipe Calderón (2012)
 President Enrique Peña Nieto (2013)
 Foreign Minister Claudia Ruiz Massieu (2015)
 Foreign Minister Luis Videgaray Caso (2017)
 Foreign Minister Marcelo Ebrard (2021)

High-level visits from Russia to Mexico
 President Vladimir Putin (2004, 2012)
 Foreign Minister Sergey Lavrov (2010, 2020)

Bilateral agreements
Both nations have signed several bilateral agreements such as an Agreement in Cultural, Scientific and Economic Cooperation (1968); Agreement in Sports Cooperation (1968); Agreement in Foreign Policy Cooperation (1968); Agreement of Prohibition of Storing Nuclear Weapons in Mexico (and in Latin America) (1973); Agreement of Scientific and Technical Cooperation (1996); Agreement on Cooperation in the peaceful uses of Nuclear Energy (2013) and a Memorandum of Understanding between both nations Foreign Diplomatic Institutions (2017).

Tourism and transportation
In the first half of 2018, over 31,000 Russian citizens visited Mexico for tourism. In return, over 13,000 Mexican citizens visited Russia to attend the 2018 FIFA World Cup. There are direct flights between Cancun and Moscow with Nordwind Airlines.

Trade
In 2018, two-way trade between both nations totaled US$2.3 billion. Mexico's main exports to Russia include: tequila, beer, beef and automobiles. Russian exports to Mexico include: chemical based products, metals, helicopters and ammunition. Mexico is Russia's third biggest trading partner in Latin America. Russian multinational companies such as Power Machines operate in Mexico and Mexican multinational companies such as Grupo Omnilife, Grupo Maseca, Nemak, Cemex, Mabe, Katcon, Metalsa and Gruma operate in Russia.

Resident diplomatic missions
 Mexico has an embassy in Moscow.
 Russia has an embassy in Mexico City.

See also
 Russian Mexicans

References

 
Russia
Bilateral relations of Russia